Claude Girven (Girve) Fretz (March 4, 1927 - November 5, 2020) was a Canadian politician, who represented the electoral district of Erie in the House of Commons of Canada from 1979 to 1993. He was a member of the Progressive Conservative Party of Canada.

Born in Ridgeway, Ontario, Fretz worked as a retail merchant for many years before entering politics. He served as both Mayor and Regional Councillor for the city of Fort Erie from 1977 to 1978. He won the Progressive Conservative Party nomination for Erie riding in 1979 and was subsequently elected later that year.

In Parliament, Fretz first served as the Secretary of the Progressive Conservative caucus from 1979 to 1980. He later served as parliamentary secretary to the Minister of Indian Affairs and Northern Development from November 1, 1984 to November 24, 1985, and to the Minister of State (Mines) from November 25, 1985 to October 14, 1986.  He also served twice on the House Standing Committee for External Affairs, and also served on the House Standing Committee for Defence.

During the 1993 P.C.leadership race, he supported Alberta MP Jim Edwards on the first ballot and Jean Charest on the second ballot. He did not run for re-election in the 1993 election.

External links 
 

1927 births
2020 deaths
Members of the House of Commons of Canada from Ontario
Progressive Conservative Party of Canada MPs
People from Fort Erie, Ontario